Lanciné Diabi (born 1956) is an Ivorian filmmaker.

Life
Lanciné Diabi was born 1956 in Ivory Coast. He studied filmmaking at the Conservatoire libre du cinéma français in Paris. His first feature film, La Jumelle, about a twin sister who sacrifices her luck for that of her twin brother, was entered for competition at the 1999 FESPACO.

Films
 L'Amour Blesse, 1989.
 L'Africaine, 1989.
 Sanou, 1989.
 L'Africaine a Paris, 1993.
 La Jumelle / The Twin Girl, 1994 or 1998.

References

1956 births
Living people
Ivorian film directors
Place of birth missing (living people)